The Del Monte Apartments is a historic building in Downtown Columbus, Ohio. It was built in 1902 and was listed on the National Register of Historic Places in 2016. The Romanesque Revival building was designed by Charles W. Bellows, a Columbus resident and nephew of George Bellows, builder of the 1887 Franklin County Courthouse in the city.

The building was constructed as a streetcar suburb-type apartment building with six flats on each of its three levels. The building interior was largely altered as it was converted for office use in 1985.

See also
 National Register of Historic Places listings in Columbus, Ohio

References

1902 establishments in Ohio
Buildings in downtown Columbus, Ohio
Commercial buildings completed in 1902
Commercial buildings on the National Register of Historic Places in Ohio
National Register of Historic Places in Columbus, Ohio
Residential buildings completed in 1902
Residential buildings on the National Register of Historic Places in Ohio
Apartment buildings in Ohio